Hüner Coşkuner (1 April 1963 – 4 February 2021) was a Turkish singer active between 1987 and 2021.

Coşkuner died in Istanbul on 4 February 2021, aged 57, after a 10-month battle with bone marrow cancer. On February 8, her funeral prayers were held at Şakirin Mosque and she was buried at Karacaahmet Cemetery.

Discography

Albums 
 Doğuş (1987)
 Sakın Dönme Geriye (1989)
 Beni Sevmeni İstiyorum (1990)
 Gidemezsin (1991)
 Haydi Tut Ellerimi (1992)
 Gidiyor (1993)
 Olamaz (1994)
 Bir Evcilik Oyunu (1995)
 Bir Hüner Coşkuner Klasiği (1996)
 Beni Tek Sen Anlarsın (1997)
 Ben Ölürüm (1998)
 İşte Düet Sevemem (with Erol Büyükburç) (1999)
 Klasikler 2 (2000)
 Vurgunum Sana (2002)
 Geleceksen Gelme Yar (2005)
 Nerede (2007)
 Klasikler 3 (2009)
 Güle Güle Git (2011)
 Yeşilçam Klasikleri (2013)
 Seni Acele Görmem Lazım (2015)

References

External links
 
 
 

20th-century Turkish women singers
21st-century Turkish women singers
1963 births
2021 deaths
Singers from Istanbul
Burials at Karacaahmet Cemetery
Deaths from cancer in Turkey
Deaths from multiple myeloma